Mohammed Musa Hashmi, known by his pen name Purnam Allahabadi was an Urdu poet and lyricist, best known for his worldwide famous Qawwali Bhar Do Jholi Meri Ya Muhammad sung by Sabri Brothers and Tumhe Dillagi originally sung by Nusrat Fateh Ali Khan.

Early life and career

Purnam Allahabadi was born in 1940 in Allahabad, British India. He settled in Karachi after the 1947 independence of Pakistan but later on moved to Lahore, Pakistan due to family disputes. There he lived in a single room flat at the Anarkali Bazaar, Lahore.

Besides writing song-lyrics for Indian and Pakistani movies, he is best known for writing masterpiece Qawwali "Bhar Do Jholi Meri Ya Muhammad" & "O Sharabi Chhod De Peena" composed & sung by: Sabri Brothers which became an evergreen blockbuster hits.

Allahabadi has also written the masterpiece ghazal "Tumhe Dillagi Bhool Jani Padegi" which was originally sung by Nusrat Fateh Ali Khan.

References

External links
Purnam Allahabadi's qawwali lyrics originally sung by the Sabri Brothers in 1975

1940 births
2009 deaths
Muhajir people
Pakistani poets
Urdu-language poets from Pakistan
Poets from Lahore